John W. Williams may refer to:
 John W. Williams (legislative clerk) (1869–1934), American legislative clerk in Virginia
 John Whitridge Williams (1866–1931), American obstetrician
 John William Williams (1827–1904), New Zealand politician
 John William Williams, elected for Victoria City in the 1878 British Columbia general election
 John Williams Wilson (1798–1857), British-Chilean sailor and politician

See also 
 John Williams (disambiguation)